The FIS Nordic World Ski Championships 1933 took place on 8–12 February 1933 in Innsbruck, Austria. This event would also debut the 4 x 10 km relay.

Men's cross country

18 km 
10 February 1933

50 km 
12 February 1933

4 × 10 km relay
12 February 1933

Men's Nordic combined

Individual 
8 February 1933

Harald Bosio was Austria's first medalist at the FIS Nordic World Ski Championships.

Men's ski jumping

Individual large hill 
8 February 1933

Medal table

References
FIS 1933 Cross country results
FIS 1933 Nordic combined results
FIS 1933 Ski jumping results
Results from German Wikipedia
Austrian medals in Nordic skiing from Sportsplanet 
Hansen, Hermann & Sveen, Knut. (1996) VM på ski '97. Alt om ski-VM 1925-1997 Trondheim: Adresseavisens Forlag. p. 46. . 

FIS Nordic World Ski Championships
1933 in Nordic combined
1933 in Austrian sport
February 1933 sports events
Nordic skiing competitions in Austria
Sports competitions in Innsbruck
20th century in Innsbruck